This is a list of members of the Victorian Legislative Assembly from 1932 to 1935, as elected at the 1932 state election.

Notes

 Oakleigh MLA James Vinton Smith was elected as an unendorsed UAP candidate after being defeated in preselection, but was immediately admitted to the parliamentary party upon his election.
 Carlton Labor MLA Robert Solly died on 5 June 1932. Labor candidate Bill Barry won the resulting by-election on 9 July 1932.
 Benambra UAP MLA Henry Beardmore died on 29 August 1932. Country Party candidate Roy Paton won the resulting by-election on 15 October 1932.
 Boroondara UAP MLA Richard Linton resigned in March 1933 to take up an appointment as Agent-General for Victoria in London. UAP candidate Trevor Oldham won the resulting by-election on 29 April 1933.
 Polwarth UAP MLA James McDonald died on 15 August 1933. His nephew, Allan McDonald, won the resulting by-election on 16 September 1933.
 Warrnambool UAP MLA James Fairbairn resigned in October 1933 to contest the Flinders federal by-election caused by the resignation of Stanley Bruce. UAP candidate Keith McGarvie won the resulting by-election on 11 November 1933.
 Allandale UAP MLA and former Premier of Victoria Alexander Peacock died on 7 October 1933. His widow Millie Peacock won the resulting by-election for the UAP on 11 November 1933, becoming the first ever woman member of the Victorian Legislative Assembly.
 Gunbower UAP MLA Henry Angus died on 2 April 1934. Independent Country candidate Norman Martin won the resulting by-election on 12 May 1934.
 Nunawading UAP MLA Robert Menzies resigned in July 1934 to contest the seat of Kooyong at the 1934 federal election. UAP candidate William Boyland won the resulting by-election on 1 September 1934.
 Clifton Hill Labor MLA and Speaker of the Assembly Maurice Blackburn resigned in July 1934 to contest the seat of Bourke at the 1934 federal election. Labor candidate Bert Cremean was elected unopposed to fill the vacancy at the close of nominations on 21 September.
 Dundas UAP MLA Athol Cooper was defeated when a recount was ordered for his seat in July 1932.

Sources
 Re-member (a database of all Victorian MPs since 1851). Parliament of Victoria.

Members of the Parliament of Victoria by term
20th-century Australian politicians